The orange-breasted bushshrike or sulphur-breasted bushshrike (Chlorophoneus sulfureopectus) is a species of bird in the family Malaconotidae. Another bird, Braun's bushshrike, is also sometimes called the orange-breasted bushshrike.

Distribution and habitat
The orange-breasted bushshrike is widespread throughout Sub-Saharan Africa (relatively absent from most of Central, Southern and the Horn of Africa). Its natural habitats are subtropical or tropical dry forests, dry savanna and moist savanna. It is not a migrant species.

Behaviour
The bushshrike eats mainly insects, such as beetles, caterpillars, bees, ants, and wasps.

References

 BirdLife International 2016.  [BirdLife International. 2016. Chlorophoneus sulfureopectus. The IUCN Red List of Threatened Species 2016: e.T22707647A94133019. https://dx.doi.org/10.2305/IUCN.UK.2016-3.RLTS.T22707647A94133019.en. Downloaded on 7 December 2018.]

External links
 Orange-breasted Bushshrike - Species text in The Atlas of Southern African Birds.
 Photo at The Internet Bird Collection

orange-breasted bushshrike
Birds of Sub-Saharan Africa
orange-breasted bushshrike
Taxonomy articles created by Polbot